Dieter Schütte (4 June 1923 – 8 February 2013) was a German publisher, working for M. DuMont Schauberg.

References 

1923 births
2013 deaths
Businesspeople from Cologne
German publishers (people)